This is a list of Mexican television related events from 2014.

Events
12 December - 43-year-old singer Pablo López wins the first season of México Tiene Talento.
14 December - Guido Rochin wins the fourth season of La Voz... México.

Debuts

19 October - México Tiene Talento (2014–present)

Television shows

1970s
Plaza Sésamo (1972–present)

2010s
La Voz... México (2011–present)

Ending this year

Births

Deaths

See also
List of Mexican films of 2014
2014 in Mexico